Dirty Records is an Auckland-based New Zealand independent record label, focusing primarily on hip hop music. It was founded in 2001 by music producer Peter "P-Money" Wadams and his business partner Callum August.

Dirty Records has been described as "one of the stand-out success stories of a thriving music scene".

Artists
 P-Money
 Scribe
 PNC
 Frontline
 David Dallas

Albums 
Unique: Jerry 4 W.A. (2002)
P-Money: Big Things (2001), Big Things Instrumentals (2002), Magic City (2004), Unreleased Joints & Remixes (2007)
Scribe: The Crusader (2003), Rhymebook (2007)
PNC: Ooooooh...On The PNC Tip - Mixtape (2005), Rookie Card (2006), Bazooka Kid (2009)
Frontline: What You Expect? (2004), Borrowed Time (2005)
David Dallas: Something Awesome (2009)

See also
 List of record labels

References

External links
 Official Dirty Records website
 Dirty Records on WorldDJ.com

IFPI members
Hip hop record labels
Independent record labels
New Zealand record labels
2001 establishments in New Zealand